Angora is an unincorporated community in Angora Township, Saint Louis County, Minnesota, United States.

The community is located six miles south of Cook at the intersection of State Highway 1 (MN 1) and Saint Louis County Road 430 (Burghardt Road). U.S. Highway 53 is nearby.

County Road 952 (Tee Road) is also in the area.  The unincorporated community of Angora is located within Angora Township (population 249).

The communities of Sherman Corner and Idington are also nearby.

The Rice River, a tributary of the Little Fork River, flows through the community.

A post office called Angora has been in operation since 1903. The community was named after Angora, in Turkey.

References

 Rand McNally Road Atlas – 2007 edition – Minnesota entry
 Official State of Minnesota Highway Map – 2011/2012 edition

Unincorporated communities in Minnesota
Unincorporated communities in St. Louis County, Minnesota